Joshua Robert Reaume (born October 11, 1990) is an American professional stock car racing driver, engineer, and team owner. He competes part-time in the NASCAR Craftsman Truck Series, driving the No. 22 Ford F-150 for AM Racing, and the No. 34 Ford for Reaume Brothers Racing.

Racing career

Early career
Born in Redlands, California to Canadian parents, Reaume grew up in Nigeria for 13 years, where his parents John and Wendy worked in humanitarian aid. After moving to Canada, at the age of 15, Reaume began racing go-karts at Western Speedway on Vancouver Island. In 2004, he won the Junior Honda karting championship, followed by the Junior Rotax titles in 2005 and 2006. The following year, he moved to stock cars and began competing in the NASCAR Grand American Modifieds California Series in 2009. In 2010, he started Late model racing. The next year, he attempted the Toyota All-Star Showdown at Irwindale Speedway, but was relegated to the Last Chance Open, where he finished ninth.

NASCAR

Regional series
In 2012, Reaume attempted to make his K&N Pro Series East debut at Iowa Speedway for Greg Rayl, but failed to qualify. He eventually made his series debut the following year at Richmond International Raceway for Jennifer MacDonald, where he finished 23rd.

Also in 2012, Reaume attempted five K&N Pro Series West events for Rayl and Dick Midgley, racing at Utah Motorsports Campus, Evergreen Speedway and Portland International Raceway and failing to qualify at Iowa and Phoenix International Raceway, recording a best finish of 15th at Evergreen. In 2013, he ran one Pro Series West race at Evergreen, finishing 14th.

National series

In 2013, Reaume made his Camping World Truck Series debut at Iowa, driving the No. 07 Chevrolet Silverado for SS-Green Light Racing and finishing 25th. Two years later, he joined Trophy Girl Racing for the Truck race at Canadian Tire Motorsport Park, finishing 30th after stalling on the backstretch. He and the team returned at New Hampshire Motor Speedway, but failed to qualify.

During a 2013 Pro Series East race, Rick Ware expressed interest in Reaume, signing him to Rick Ware Racing for his Nationwide Series debut at Richmond the following year; after qualifying 37th, he finished 30th. He ran ten more races in 2014 for Ware and JGL Racing, recording a best finish of 25th at Dover International Speedway. In 2015, Nigerian entrepreneur Victor Obaika, a friend of Reaume, signed him to Obaika Racing to drive the No. 97. After running the first two races and failing to qualify at Las Vegas Motor Speedway, he was replaced by Peyton Sellers. He later joined MBM Motorsports, running 12 races with the team in 2015 with a best finish of 29th at Michigan International Speedway.

In 2016, Reaume failed to qualify for the second race at Atlanta Motor Speedway with MBM. He then drove the No. 93 to a 38th-place finish at Las Vegas Motor Speedway, and returned to MBM for the next race at Phoenix International Raceway, but failed to qualify.  He then took charge of the No. 93, but failed to qualify at Talladega Superspeedway. In the next race at Dover International Speedway, he piloted the car to a 37th-place finish.

Over the offseason between 2017 and 2018, Reaume laid the groundwork to field his own NASCAR Camping World Truck Series team, Reaume Brothers Racing, in 2018. The team failed to qualify for the season-opening race at Daytona International Speedway but continued towards its goal of a full-time schedule. In 2019, Reaume earned the first top 10 finish in his career at Daytona after qualifying in last place.

In June 2020, Reaume Brothers Racing formed an alliance with Xfinity team RSS Racing in which Reaume took over operations of RSS's No. 93 car. During August's Sunoco 159 on the Daytona road course, Reaume replaced RBR driver Bobby Kennedy in the No. 00 when Kennedy was feeling unwell.

On November 11, 2020, Reaume was indefinitely suspended by NASCAR for violating Sections 12.1 and 12.8.1.e of the NASCAR rule book for a discriminatory post made on social media. Although NASCAR did not mention what post caused the suspension as per their policy, Reaume claimed to NASCAR journalist Toby Christie that a photo of a toaster strudel with a swastika icing was the cause of the suspension. Reaume denied intentionally painting the swastika, but accepted the penalty. As per the penalty, Reaume had to take mandatory sensitivity training before being reinstated. He, alongside fellow driver Mike Wallace, was reinstated on March 31, 2021. Reaume's first race as a driver since his suspension came at Richmond in April in his No. 34. On September 16, 2022, after the UNOH 200, it was revealed that he had been diagnosed with a concussion after he got hit in the driver's side by the No. 7 Spire Motorsports car of Rajah Caruth.

Mechanic career
In 2012, Reaume graduated from the University of Victoria in mechanical engineering. After serving an internship for Toyota Racing Development, Reaume started working for TriStar Motorsports. For 2019, Reaume is set to crew chief the No. 42 entry for MBM Motorsports in the NASCAR Xfinity Series, primarily driven by Chad Finchum.

Personal life
On May 28, 2017, he married Olivia-Grace Morrison in Statesville, North Carolina.

Motorsports career results

NASCAR
(key) (Bold – Pole position awarded by qualifying time. Italics – Pole position earned by points standings or practice time. * – Most laps led.)

Xfinity Series

Craftsman Truck Series

 Season still in progress
 Ineligible for series points

K&N Pro Series East

K&N Pro Series West

References

External links
 
 
 

Living people
1990 births
People from Redlands, California
University of Victoria alumni
Canadian racing drivers
NASCAR drivers
NASCAR crew chiefs
Canadian expatriates in Nigeria
NASCAR controversies